Carlos Ernesto Fernando Ferrero Costa (born 7 February 1941) is a Peruvian politician who served as congressman as a member of Perú Posible representing  Lima from 1995 until 2006 and also served as the President of the Congress from late-2000 until 2003. He was the Prime Minister of Peru from December 2003 until his resignation August 2005. He belongs to the Perú Posible party. Before he became a member of the Perú Posible party, he was part of the Fujimorist Cambio 90 of Alberto Fujimori. 

His predecessor was Beatriz Merino, who resigned on October 15, 2003 at the request of President Alejandro Toledo.

Biography 
He was born on February 7, 1941. Son of the agronomist Alfredo Ferrero Rebagliati and Adelina Costa Elice, he was born in Lima in 1941, a few days later his family moved to Pisco, Ica. He returned to Lima, where he completed his initial studies at the Immaculate Heart School, and then finished high school at the Santa María Marianistas School.

His uncle, Raúl Ferrero Rebagliati, was President of the Council of Ministers and Minister of Foreign Affairs. His brother, lawyer and diplomat Eduardo Ferrero Costa, was Chancellor during Alberto Fujimori's second government.

His higher studies were carried out at the Pontifical Catholic University of Peru, which he entered in 1959. At that university he graduated with a Bachelor of Arts (1964) and Law (1966). He also studied at the Center for Higher Military Studies.

During his university days he was a member of the Christian Social Student Front.

He practiced radio journalism on Radio Miraflores as a political commentator (1965-1969). In the same way, he has been a news commentator on Panamericana Televisión (1978-1980) and América Televisión (1989). He was Co-host of the 2x2 television program on Canal N (1999-2000).

He worked at the Central Reserve Bank of Peru (1965-1982). He entered the Department of Economic Studies and followed training at the International Monetary Fund in Analysis and Financial Policy (1967). He then went on to work for the General Secretariat of the BCR.

He was administrative manager of the BCR (1976-1980) and president of the Peruvian part of the Puyango-Tumbes Binational Commission (1978-1980). He went on to the bank's legal department until he resigned in 1982.

He has been a professor of Law at the universities: Femenina del Sagrado Corazón (1965-1967), Católica, Ricardo Palma, San Martín de Porres, San Marcos and Lima, as well as the Diplomatic Academy of Peru.

Political career 
He worked for former President Alberto Fujimori, and was elected several times under his party, Cambio 90–New Majority, After he was in disgrace with the government, he passed to the opposition party. In the 2000 elections, he ran for First Vice President as the running mate of Alejandro Toledo in his Perú Posible ticked but the ticket lost to Alberto Fujimori’s Peru 2000 ticket. Nevertheless, he was re-elected to the Congress. In late-2000, after the resignation of Fujimori, he ran against Valentín Paniagua for the Presidency of the Peruvian Congress. He lost the election, and Paniagua claimed his position as Interim President of Peru. He would then become President of the Congress in 2000, and was reaffirmed in 2001 and 2002 and served until 2003.

he became Prime Minister of December 15, 2003.  On January 13, 2004, he appeared before the Congress of the Republic to present the general policy of the government and ask for the vote of confidence (or also called the investiture). Ferrero addressed the congressmen and announced that the government would meet the growing social demands and that it would follow the lines that the Toledo government proposed since July 2001: improving institutions, reducing poverty, strengthening trade and the economy, reform and modernization of the State and fight against corruption. Ferrero emphasized the reform of the State to combat corruption, the realignment of public resources. Ferrero announced the proposal to modify the Organic Law of the Executive Power, the draft Framework Law of Public Employment, the Law of incompatibilities and prohibitions for the exercise of public function, the law of the Public Employment Remuneration System. He also announced that they would promote the simplification of procedures, decentralization, private investment, education, social programs, among others. At the end of his presentation, Ferrero raised the question of confidence, which obtained 49 votes in favor, 6 against and 44 abstentions.

He resigned abruptly August 11, 2005 when president Alejandro Toledo appointed Fernando Olivera as Minister of Foreign Affairs. He failed to attain re-election in the 2006 elections.

His brother is Eduardo Ferrero Coast who is the former Ambassador (and former Minister of Foreign Affairs under the Fujimori Administration) in the United States.

References

External links
Official Site

1941 births
Living people
Prime Ministers of Peru
Peruvian people of Italian descent
Possible Peru politicians
Members of the Congress of the Republic of Peru
Presidents of the Congress of the Republic of Peru
Members of the Democratic Constituent Congress

Fujimorista politicians
People from Lima